Plowing Into the Field of Love is the third studio album by Danish punk band Iceage. The album was released through Matador Records on October 6, 2014 worldwide and on October 7, 2014 in the US.

Reception

Plowing Into the Field of Love received positive reviews from critics, achieving a 76/100 on Metacritic based on 21 reviews, indicating "generally favourable reviews". Kyle Greco of Smash Cut Reviews gave the album a positive review calling it "one of the more inventive and replayable punk records of the year." He gave the album a score of 8.8/10.

Track listing

Personnel
Iceage
 Dan Kjær Nielsen – drums, percussions
 Johan Surrballe Wieth – guitar, viola
 Jakob Tvilling Pless – bass, mandolin
 Elias Bender Rønnenfelt – vocal, guitar, piano

Additional musicians
Asger Valentin – trumpets

Technical personnel
Mixed by Nis Bysted and Iceage
Mastered by Emil Thomsen
Cover photo by Kristian Emdal
Produced by Nis Bysted and Iceage

References

2014 albums
Iceage albums